Philip Birnbaum (1907-1996) was an American architect. His work was described as "[exceeding] just about any other architect in recent decades."

In addition to working on some famous buildings, such as 1 Lincoln Plaza or Trump Plaza, he designed about 300 other buildings that were notable for "virtually no wasted floor space"; he also worked outside of Manhattan and New York City.

Education 
Birnbaum grew up in Washington Heights, attended Stuyvesant High School, and graduated in Architecture from Columbia University. Although he was accepted into Princeton University, he was told by the institution itself that he might "not fit into the environment" due to his religion and heritage.

References

Architects from New York City
1907 births
1996 deaths
20th-century American architects